Isabella Biagini, born Concetta Biagini, (8 December 1940 – 14 April 2018) was an Italian actress and showgirl.

Life and career 
Biagini was born in Rome on 8 December 1940. She debuted in childhood as a radio actress and advertising model.  At 14 she entered the Miss Italia competition, and made her film debut in a minor role in Michelangelo Antonioni's Le Amiche (1955). Later from the 1960s, Biagini worked assiduously on the radio and television and posed on many fotonovelas. On the small screen, she achieved some success not only as showgirl but also as talented impersonator; on the big screen, despite of the numerous appearances, her roles were usually stereotyped. In later years, Biagini has been a protagonist of news columns in relation to the critical conditions of poverty in which she lived.

Partial filmography 

 Il cocco di mamma (1957) - Rosa
 La zia d'America va a sciare (1957) - La vedette
 Serenatella sciuè sciuè (1958) - Ilde
 I due mafiosi (1964) - Jacqueline
 Slalom (1965) - Simonetta Riccardo
 Love Italian Style (1966) - Assunta
 Supermen Against the Orient (1967)
 Pensando a te (1969)
 Gli infermieri della mutua (1969) - Valeria
 Quelli belli... siamo noi (1970) - Fiore Castrosalvo - Gino's niece
 La ragazza del prete (1970) - Maria Innocenza Furlan
 Mazzabubù... quante corna stanno quaggiù? (1971) - Franco's wife
 Io non vedo, tu non parli, lui non sente (1971) - Cecilia
 Il clan dei due Borsalini (1971) - Il fantasma
 Boccaccio (1972) - Ambrugia
 Il sindacalista (1972) - Teresa Piredda - Saverio's wife
 Il terrore con gli occhi storti (1972) - Mirella Trombetti
 Maria Rosa la guardona (1973) - Maria Rosa Ceccantoni
 Supermen Against the Orient (1973) - Moglie del console
 L'erotomane (1974) - Dott.ssa Bonetti
 Paolo il freddo (1974) - Rich woman
 Loaded Guns (1975) - Rosy
 La ragazza dalla pelle di corallo (1976) - Antonella
 Nick the Sting (1976) - Edy
 Atti impuri all'italiana (1976) - Wife of Chemist
 Stangata in famiglia (1976)
 Il ginecologo della mutua (1979) - Giovanna
 Tutti a squola (1979) - Prostituta
 Ciao marziano (1980) - Isabella
 La cameriera seduce i villeggianti (1980) - Pucci Ferretti
 "FF.SS." – Cioè: "...che mi hai portato a fare sopra a Posillipo se non mi vuoi più bene?" (1983) - Madonna Sofia
 The Future Is Woman (1984) - (uncredited)
 Grandi magazzini (1986) - Tester
 Capriccio (1987) - Stella Polaris
 La bruttina stagionata (1996) - madre di Olimpia
 Il segreto del giaguaro (2000) - Contessa Kampari Madness (final film role)

References

External links 

 

1940 births
2018 deaths
Italian film actresses
Italian television actresses
Italian television personalities
Italian impressionists (entertainers)
Actresses from Rome
20th-century Italian actresses